Ipojucan Lins de Araújo (3 June 1926 – 19 June 1978) was a Brazilian footballer who played as a forward. He made eight appearances for the Brazil national team from 1952 to 1955. He was also part of Brazil's squad for the 1953 South American Championship.

References

External links
 

1926 births
1978 deaths
People from Maceió
Brazilian footballers
Association football forwards
Brazil international footballers
CR Vasco da Gama players
Associação Portuguesa de Desportos players